Schinia aurantiaca is a moth of the family Noctuidae. It is found in North America, including California and Arizona.

The wingspan is about 17 mm.

The larvae feed on Eriastrum sapphirinum and Gilia species.

Subspecies
Schinia aurantiaca aurantiaca
Schinia aurantiaca tenuimargo

External links
Image
Schinia aurantiaca tenuimargo image

Aurantiaca
Moths described in 1881
Moths of North America